Jordan Brown (born 9 October 1987) is a Northern Irish professional snooker player. After winning back-to-back Northern Ireland Amateur Championships in 2008 and 2009, he made his debut on the professional tour in 2009–10 but lost his tour card after one season. He rejoined the tour in 2018 after qualifying via Q School.

He made his Crucible debut at the 2020 World Snooker Championship. In January 2021, he reached the quarterfinals of the German Masters, and in February 2021, he won his first ranking title at the Welsh Open, defeating Ronnie O'Sullivan 9–8 in the final. Ranked 81st in the world before the event, and rated a 750–1 outsider by bookmakers, he became the lowest-ranked player to win a ranking event since 1993.

Career
After winning the Northern Ireland Amateur Championship in 2008 and 2009, Brown received a tour card for the 2009–10 snooker season but lasted only one season on the tour. As an occasional wild card entrant to ranking events, he enjoyed some notable victories, such as defeating John Higgins 4–3 in the 2012 Scottish Open. In 2016, he competed in the inaugural Northern Ireland Open, where he defeated world number 26 Ben Woollaston 4–2 in the first round before losing to Kyren Wilson in the second round by the same scoreline.

In May 2018, he entered Q School in a bid to rejoin the professional tour. Although he lost to Jak Jones in the final round of the first event, he secured his place at the second event after beating Andy Hicks and Jamie Cope.

In the 2020 World Snooker Championship qualifiers, he defeated Rory McLeod, Hossein Vafaei and Ryan Day to reach the Crucible for the first time. His debut ended with a 6–10 first-round loss to Mark Selby.

In January 2021, he reached the quarterfinals of the German Masters but lost 1–5 to Barry Hawkins. At the Welsh Open in February 2021, he defeated Selby 5–4 in the quarterfinals, Stephen Maguire 6–1 in the semifinals, and Ronnie O'Sullivan 9–8 in the final to capture his maiden ranking title. The winner's prize for the event was £70,000. Ranked 81st in the world before the tournament, Brown became the lowest-ranked player to win a ranking event since world number 93 Dave Harold won the Asian Open in 1993. He also became the fourth Northern Irish player to claim a ranking title, after Alex Higgins, Dennis Taylor and Mark Allen.

Performance and rankings timeline

Career finals

Ranking finals: 1 (1 title)

Pro-am finals: 4 (2 titles)

Amateur finals: 9 (4 titles)

References

External links
Jordan Brown at worldsnooker.com

Snooker players from Northern Ireland
Living people
1987 births
People from Antrim, County Antrim